Renault is a French multinational automobile manufacturer established in 1899.

Renault may also refer to:

Vehicles

Renault in Formula One, Formula One activities of the French automobile company named Renault
Renault Sport Technologies, sports division of the French automobile company named Renault
Formula Renault, a class of car racing supported by Renault Sport
Renault Trucks, French truck and bus manufacturing subsidiary of AB Volvo
Renault Agriculture, defunct French agricultural equipment manufacturer
Military vehicles by Renault, such as tanks like Renault R40
Aircraft engines by Renault, such as the Renault 4P

People
Renault is a French surname, probably originating from Brittany, easily confused with Renaud, which in French is pronounced in the same way.

Alain Renault, French politician (Revolutionary Nationalist Groups)
Alexandre-Jacques Renault (1768-1820), French politician
Amédée Renault (1920-2008), French politician
Ana Paula Renault (1981–), Brazilian journalist, columnist and TV personality
Annaig Renault (1946-2012), French author
Bernard Renault (botanist) (1836-1904), French paleobotanist
Bernard Renault (canoeist), French slalom canoeist
Camille Renault (1866-1954), French sculptor (Jean-Baptiste-Charles-Camille Renault)
Cécile Renault (1774–1794), French woman accused of attempting to assassinate Robespierre
Christophe Renault (1971-), French editor, historian
Renault Renaldo Duncan (1904-1980), Duncan Renaldo, possibly Romanian-born American actor
Emmanuel Renault (1967-), French philosopher 
Éric Renault (1956-), French scientist
Fernand Renault (1865–1909), French business manager, one of the founders of the Renault automobile company
François Louis de Rousselet, Marquis de Châteaurenault (1637-1716), French vice-admiral, maréchal, and nobleman
Gilbert Renault (1904–1984), French Resistance secret agent during World War II
Henri-René Renault (1891–1952), Canadian politician
Jean-Charles Danse-Renault (1761-1831), French politician
Jeanne Renault Saint-Laurent (1886-1966), wife of Louis St. Laurent, Prime Minister of Canada
Léon Renault (1839-1933), French politician, senator, juris doctor
Louis Renault (jurist) (1843–1918), French jurist and educator, Nobel peace prize 1907
Louis Renault (industrialist) (1877–1944), French industrialist, one of the founders of the Renault automobile company
Louise Renault, French shooter, European champion
Marcel Renault (1872–1903), French race driver, one of the founders of the Renault automobile company
Maxime Renault (1990-), French racing cyclist
Murielle Renault (1972-), French author 
Mary Renault (1905–1983), British writer
Patrick Renault, French TV screenwriter 
Philip Francois Renault (before 1719–c. 1750), French explorer and courtier
Pierre Hippolyte Publius Renault (1807-1870), French division general
Pierre Antoine Renault (1750-1835), French botanist
Stéphane Renault (1968-), French badminton player
Thomas-Eugène-Eloi Renault (1805-1863), French veterinary, professor
Thomas Renault de Saint-Germain (1781-1833), French military and colonial administrator
Charles Lebrun-Renault (1853-1921), character in the Dreyfus affair
Jean Malo-Renault (1900–1988), French engraver and librarian
Édouard-Pierre Renault-Morlière (1833-1901), French military
Amédée Renault-Morlière (1839-1907), French politician
Renault Robinson, (1942-), US police officer and chairman of Chicago Housing Authority

Fiction
Captain Louis Renault, in the film Casablanca
Jerry Renault, the protagonist of The Chocolate War
Dr. Renault's Secret, 1942 motion picture from 20th Century Fox
Bernard, Jacques and Jean Renault, related characters in the Twin Peaks TV series, see List of Twin Peaks characters#Renault family

Other
Château-Renault is a commune in the Indre-et-Loire department in Centre region, France
Auberville-la-Renault is a commune in the Seine-Maritime department in the Normandy region in northern France
Renault, Illinois, USA, an unincorporated community
Renault (cognac), a brand and a manufacturer of Cognac (French Brandy Liquor)
Renault (cycling team), a French road-racing team 1978–1985
Renault Winery, a winery in New Jersey
Ogilvy Renault, a large Canadian law firm (1879-2010)

See also
Renaud (disambiguation)
Renald, given name
Reynard (disambiguation)
Raynaud's phenomenon
Raynaud's disease

Surnames of Breton origin
Germanic-language surnames
Surnames from given names